The Prussian War Ministry was gradually established between 1808 and 1809 as part of a series of reforms initiated by the Military Reorganization Commission created after the disastrous Treaties of Tilsit. The War Ministry was to help bring the Army under constitutional review, and, along with the General Staff systematize the conduct of warfare.  Gerhard von Scharnhorst, the most prominent and influential of the reformers, served as acting war minister from roughly 1808 until 1810 (he was also Chief of the General Staff).

History
The War Ministry was established on 25 December 1808, replacing the old military institutions. The Ministry consisted of two departments. The first department was responsible for the command and condition of the army, the second for its financial administration.

At first, no War Minister was appointed due to the resistance of Frederick William III. Gerhard von Scharnhorst became head of the first department (the General War Department; Allgemeines Kriegsdepartement) and Lieutenant Colonel Graf Lottum became head of the second department. Scharnhorst also functioned as acting War Minister, as long as no permanent appointment was made.

The first department in turn consisted of three divisions. The first division represented the continuation of the old Adjutancy-General and was also known as the "secret military cabinet". It in turn had control over the general war chancellery. The second division of the War Ministry dealt with general army matters: troop formations, replacements and turnover, housing, military exercises, and mobilization. A third division was also created: the artillery and engineering division. This in turn comprised the artillery section, which dealt with artillery equipment, rifle production, ordnance production, gunpowder factories, etc.; and the engineering section, which was responsible for maintaining the fortresses.

The second department, the military economy department, had four divisions. The first division was responsible for pay, the second for catering, the third clothing and the fourth invalids.

In 1919, it formed the basis of Weimar Germany's Ministry of the Reichswehr.

Location

For exactly one hundred years, from 1 January 1819 to 1 January 1919 (when the ministry ceased to exist) in the Friedrichstadt quarter of what is today Mitte:

Leipziger Straße 5 facing south, with the garden bordering on the Prinz-Albrecht-Palais (demolished in 1935 to erect the Ministry of Aviation building)
Additional office usage
1824 Wilhelmstrasse 81
1871 Old General Staff building, Behrenstraße 66
General Staff
after approximately 1820: Behrenstraße 66 (now the rear part of offices belonging to the Russian embassy)
1867/71 new building (Great General Staff) in the Tiergarten: Königsplatz (now the Platz der Republik), the western corner facing the Moltkestraße
Military cabinet
after approximately 1820: Hinter dem Gießhaus 2 (behind the Zeughaus)
around 1900: Behrenstraße 66

Prussian Ministers of War, 1808–1919
† denotes people who died in office.

|}

For further succession, see List of German defence ministers.

Notes

References

 
Lists of government ministers of Prussia
Ministries established in 1808

de:Preußisches Kriegsministerium